Peter Semolič (born 1 February 1967) is a Slovene poet and translator. He has published numerous collections of poetry and his poems have been translated into English, German, Italian, French, Spanish, Polish, Hungarian, Finnish, Serbian, Bulgarian and Macedonian. He translates from English, French, Serbian and Croatian and also writes radio plays and children's literature.

Semolič was born in Ljubljana in 1967 and studied Linguistics and Sociology of culture at the University of Ljubljana. In 1997 he won the Jenko Award for his poetry collection Hiša iz besed (House Made of Words) and in 2001 the Prešeren Foundation Award for his poetry collection Krogi na vodi (Circles Upon the Water).

Poetry collections
 Rimska Cesta (The Milky Way), 2009
 Vožnja okrog sonca (A Drive Round the Sun), 2008
 Prostor zate (A Space for You ), 2006
 Barjanski ognji (Bog Fires), 2004
 Meja (Border), 2002
 Vprašanja o poti (Questions About the Path), 2001
 Krogi v vodi (Circles Upon the Water), 2000
 Hiša iz besed (House Made of Words), 1996
 Bizantinske rože (The Roses of Byzantium), 1994
 Tamariša (Tamarisk), 1991

References

1967 births
Living people
Slovenian poets
Slovenian male poets
Slovenian translators
Writers from Ljubljana
University of Ljubljana alumni